Barnstaple Long Bridge is a medieval bridge linking Tawstock with Barnstaple in North Devon, England, spanning the River Taw. One of the largest medieval bridges in Britain, it is a Grade I listed building and ancient monument. Another major medieval bridge, the Bideford Long Bridge over the River Torridge, is a few miles away.

History

The date of the first bridge as Barnstaple's main bridge across the River Taw is unclear. A will of 1274 left money for its upkeep and it underwent construction work around 1280 with further work being undertaken in 1333, and the bridge was partially destroyed in 1437 and 1646. It is unclear whether all of the arches were originally built of stone or whether three were wooden (known as "maiden Arches") until replacement in the 16th century.

In 1796, the bridge was widened again. The footpath was added in the 1830s and cast iron used to strengthen the bridge under the direction of James Green. In the 1960s some of the original stonework of the deck was replaced with  concrete faced with masonry, above the original stone arches, removing the Victorian ironworks to give the bridge an image identical to how it would have looked between 1796 and 1832.

Traffic congestion was considerable on the bridge until, in May 2007, the Barnstaple Western Bypass was opened so traffic heading towards Braunton and Ilfracombe avoids travelling through the town centre over the ancient bridge. It was expected to have cost £42 million. In 2016 plans were announced to upgrade the bridge including widening of footpaths and the creation of cycle lanes.

Structure

References

Further reading
Oliver, Bruce W., The Long Bridge of Barnstaple, Transactions of the  Devon Association, vol. 70 (1938) pp.193-197; vol. 78, (1946) pp.177-191.

Bridges in Devon
Bridges completed in the 13th century
1280 establishments in England
Grade I listed buildings in Devon
Grade I listed bridges
Long Bridge
Industrial archaeological sites in Devon